Jangy-Bazar may refer to the following places in Kyrgyzstan:

Jangy-Bazar, Jalal-Abad, a village in Chatkal District, Jalal-Abad Region
Jangy-Bazar, Osh, a village in Nookat District, Osh Region